José María "Pepe" López Planelles (born on 17 August 1995 in Madrid) is a Spanish rally driver. He is the champion of the Spanish Rally Championship and Spanish Super Rally Championship.

Rally results

WRC results
 
* Season still in progress.

References

External links

 
Pepe López's e-wrc profile

Living people
1995 births
Spanish rally drivers
World Rally Championship drivers
Sportspeople from Madrid
Peugeot Sport drivers
FIA Motorsport Games drivers
Saintéloc Racing drivers